Baldinger may refer to

Brian Baldinger (born 1960), American football player
Clare Balding (born 1971), English journalist and author
Dirk Baldinger (born 1971), German racing cyclist
Ernst Gottfried Baldinger (1738-1804), German physician
Gary Baldinger (born 1963), American football player
Gerald Barnard Balding Jr. (1936–2014), British racehorse trainer, known as Toby Balding
Ivor G. Balding (1908-2005), British champion polo player
Kurt Baldinger (1919-2007), Swiss linguist and philologist
Rich Baldinger (born 1959), American football player